Les Marches is a former commune in the Savoie department in the Auvergne-Rhône-Alpes region in south-eastern France. On 1 January 2019, it was merged into the new commune Porte-de-Savoie.

Twin towns
It is twinned with 
 Stepps and Cardowan near Glasgow, Scotland, United Kingdom. Les Marches translates in English as 'The Steps' and it was this connection that was noticed by a Les Marches resident in 1995 on a visit to Scotland.

See also
Communes of the Savoie department

References

External links

Official site

Former communes of Savoie